Shast Pich-e Olya (also Romanized as Shaşt Pīch-e ‘Olyā; also known as Shaşt Fīch and Shaşt Pīch) is a village in Bezenjan Rural District, in the Central District of Baft County, Kerman Province, Iran. At the 2006 census, its population was 133, in 47 families.

References 

Populated places in Baft County